Amaravathi is a 2009 Indian Telugu-language thriller film written and directed by Ravi Babu.  The film's lead actors included Sneha, Bhumika Chawla, and Ravi Babu.  Sindhura Gadde and Taraka Ratna played supporting roles. The film was released on 3 December 2009 to positive reviews.
It was remake of 2002 South Korean film H.

Plot
A friendship blossoms between Sreenu, the son of a maid servant, and Amaravathi, the daughter of the landlord in whose house the maid worked. But Sreenu has feelings on Amaravathi and shows his love on her with a few sadistic approaches. One day, a play between the boy and girl infuriates the landlord, who kills the maid, slits Sreenu's throat, and throws him in a river. Sreenu is saved by a hypnotist who finds him by the riverside, restores his life, and teaches him hypnosis.

In the present day, police are baffled by a series of crimes where the sadistic perpetrator was stealing babies from pregnant women, leaving the women to bleed to death. Task force officer Venkat is recalled from a sabbatical and given charge of the case. He solves the case and apprehends the culprit, but the crimes against pregnant women continue with the culprit in jail. Venkat investigates further and finds out that he is Sreenu and he discovered his past. After his treatment, Sreenu is attracted to hypnotism and learns from him. Later, he decides to win Amaravathi back and tries his hypnotic studies on one of the hypnotist's assistants. The assistant suffers severe injuries. Then, Sreenu escapes from the clinic and goes back to his village. He meets his one of his childhood friends and finds out that she is married and settled in Hyderabad. Sreenu later kills the landlord through hypnosis as revenge for separation from Amaravathi. Then, he goes to Amaravathi's home and observes that she is very close with her husband. Unable to bear the closeness of them, Sreenu brutally kills Amaravathi's husband in their bathroom. Later, after Amaravathi looks at her husband's dead body, she accidentally falls on her foot on the rod which Sreenu used to kill him. Then, she falls on the bathtub edge and suffers a severe head injury which leads to a miscarriage, and she becomes mentally insane. Later, she asks Sreenu to search her 10 children. Sreenu accepts to search and marries her.

Now in the present day, Venkat determines that the crimes were committed by the task force who worked to catch the culprit by hypnotizing them.  By the time Venkat completes his investigation, Sreenu escapes from prison. Venkat deduces that Sreenu wanted a total of 10 babies to complete his mission and was one short. Venkat wants to save the baby and the mother from Sreenu. Venkat discovers that the tenth baby wanted  (Sreenu) was that of his pregnant wife. Sreenu is collecting the ten babies for Amaravathi. Amaravathi has a desire of having everything in tens. She wants ten children badly but is unfit to have children. Therefore, Sreenu kidnaps the daughter of the doctor and blackmails her to plant her fetus in 10 women who approach him in hopes of conceiving. After finishing her work, he hypnotizes her and makes her commit suicide. Meanwhile, Venkat disappears. His colleagues are shocked to find that Sreenu uses Venkat as his delivery man by hypnotizing him. Venkat takes her wife to Sreenu's hideout in the city's outskirts. Sreenu and his trusted aid start to take the baby from her womb. The taskforce arrives on time and makes him normal. After knowing the facts, Venkat becomes furious. A fight ensues between Venkat and Sreenu in which Venkat wins. The task force kills Amaravathi's caretaker and takes possession of all babies. Sreenu realizes his guilt, gives a loaded pistol to Amaravathi, and kills himself through her. Venkat injects an antidote in his wife which was prescribed by her personal doctor.  The antidote saves his wife and baby. His colleague says that the babies technically belong to Amaravati and Sreenu. Venkat objects and orders the babies be given to their mothers. The film ends with Venkat looking at his wife and his wife happily looking at her baby.

Cast
 Taraka Ratna as Srinu
 Bhumika Chawla as Amaravathi
 Ravi Babu as Venkat
 Sneha as Latha Venkat
 Sindhura Gadde as Kiran
 Yadagiri Rodda as Lawyer
 Allari Subhashini as Srinu's trusted aid.
 Kota Srinivasa Rao as Dr. Sebastian
 Madhusudhan Rao as Amaravathi's father
 Y. Kasi Viswanath as Viswanath, Dr.Sebastian Assisstent
 Paruchuri Gopala Krishna as Hypnotist
 Ravi Prakash as Amaravathi's husband
 Sudeepa Pinky

Awards

2009 - Nandi Award for Best Villain - Taraka Ratna

2009 - Nandi Award for Best Cinematographer - Sudhakar Reddy

See also
 Telugu films of 2009

References

Indian remakes of South Korean films
2009 films
2000s serial killer films
2000s Telugu-language films
Indian thriller films
Films directed by Ravi Babu
2009 thriller films
Indian serial killer films